Horace Hyman Davis (1 February 1889 – 4 February 1960) was an Australian cricketer. He played twelve first-class matches for New South Wales between 1911/12 and 1924/25.

See also
 List of New South Wales representative cricketers

References

External links
 

1889 births
1960 deaths
Australian cricketers
New South Wales cricketers
Cricketers from Sydney